Bandeira do Sul is a Brazilian municipality located in the state of Minas Gerais. Its population  is estimated to be 5,778 people, living between 660 and 989 meters elevation.

The area of Bandeira do Sul is 46.917 km². The city belongs to the mesoregion of Sul e Sudoeste de Minas and to the microregion of Poços de Caldas.

See also
 List of municipalities in Minas Gerais

References

Municipalities in Minas Gerais